A with ring above (А̊ а̊; italics: А̊ а̊) is a letter of the Cyrillic script. In all its forms it looks exactly like the Latin letter A with ring above (Å å Å å).

A with ring above is used only in the alphabet of the Selkup language where it represents the open-mid back rounded vowel /ɔ/ or the open back rounded vowel /ɒ/.

See also
Å å : Latin letter Å
Cyrillic characters in Unicode

Cyrillic letters with diacritics